A grappling hook or grapnel is a device that typically has multiple hooks (known as claws or flukes) attached to a rope; it is thrown, dropped, sunk, projected, or fastened directly by hand to where at least one hook may catch and hold onto objects. Generally, grappling hooks are used to temporarily secure one end of a rope. They may also be used to dredge for submerged objects.

The device was invented by the Romans in approximately 260 BC. The grappling hook was originally used in naval warfare to catch ship rigging so that it could be boarded.

Design
A common design has a central shaft with a hole ("eye") at the shaft base to attach the rope, and three or four equally spaced hooks at the end, arranged so that at least one is likely to catch on some protuberance of the target. Some modern designs feature folding hooks to resist unwanted attachment. Most grappling hooks are thrown by hand, but some used in rescue work are propelled by compressed air (e.g., the Plumett AL-52), line thrower, mortar, or a rocket.

Applications

Military 

Grappling hooks are used by combat engineers to breach tactical obstacles. When used as such, the grappling hook is launched in front of an obstacle and dragged backwards to detonate tripwire-fused land mines, and can be hooked on wire obstacles and pulled to set off booby traps on the wire. Two tools are available for this purpose; the rifle-launched grapnel (LGH), a single-use grappling hook placed on the end of an M4/M16 rifle, or the crossbow launched version. A grapnel can clear up to 99% of the trip-wires in a single pass. During WW2 British and German ships would tow grappling hooks in the hope of snagging or damaging enemy submarines; this was a tactic also employed by the Japanese. Grappling hooks were used at the D-Day landings to aid soldiers climbing the cliffs at the Normandy beaches.

Maritime 

As well as the grapnel anchor grapnels are used in the removal and repair of subsea cables, large ships called cable layers drag huge grapnels across the seabed until they snag a cable.

In popular culture
Grappling hooks, grapple guns, and their many variants have been a staple in many video games.

In the anime and manga franchise Attack on Titan, some omni-directional maneuvering gear are equipped with modified, gas operated grapple guns that placed in their hips or wrist to manoeuvre them.

See also
 Dragon beard hook
 Grapple (tool)
 Kaginawa
 Line thrower

References

External links

 Rangers Storm the Cliffs of Pointe du Hoc on D-Day 73 Years Ago (June 6, 2017)

Climbing equipment
Mountaineering equipment